Irfan Ceklkupa was an Albanian politician and mayor of Tirana from 1957 through 1958.

References

Year of birth missing
Year of death missing
Mayors of Tirana